Three Guys Named Mike is a 1951 American romantic comedy film directed by Charles Walters and starring Jane Wyman, Van Johnson, Howard Keel, and Barry Sullivan.<ref name="TCMProfile">"Articles: 'Three Guys Named Mike'." 'Turner Classic Movies. Retrieved: December 22, 2008.</ref> It was released by Metro-Goldwyn-Mayer.

Described as a "lighthearted and lightweight story" by Turner Classic Movies, Three Guys Named Mike chronicles the story of an airline stewardess (the term at that time) and her three suitors.

Plot
Marcy Lewis is a young woman from Indiana with an ambition to become an airline stewardess and see the world. She takes an American Airlines training course and passes. Her first flight is nearly her last when, after inadvertently offending the pilot, Mike Jamison, she forgets the passengers' food. Unknown to Marcy, Mike's intervention with her boss earns her a second chance.

Marcy's home base is moved to Los Angeles and she finds an apartment with one friend from stewardess school. She meets a passenger, Mike Lawrence, who is a graduate research student in biology, then also nearly loses her job again by permitting a young passenger to keep her dog in the cabin, against the airline's rules. Marcy is suspended for a week.

While she's house-hunting, the battery in Marcy's car dies and a man named Mike Tracy helps push start it. Only later does she learn that he works for a Chicago advertising agency. An idea of hers, to let stewardesses endorse soap, pleases Tracy's client, and soon Marcy is invited by a photographer to pose for magazine ads herself.

When all three show up to help Marcy move into the new bungalow she is now sharing with three of her friends from stewardess training, she struggles to keep the Mikes straight. Marcy names her male companions, Mike for Mike Lawrence, Mickey for Mike Tracy and Michael for Mike Jamison. All of them are jealous of Marcy and vie for her attention.

During a party later at her bungalow, Marcy is called away when ad agency's photographer requests one more picture to send out with the rest of the ad campaign for approval. Marcy finds herself dressed in a very short sarong, totally unlike the regulation company uniform in which all the other pictures were taken. The photographer is clearly inebriated and flirts aggressively with her. She objects strenuously, but he ignores her objections.

The three Mikes arrive in time to thwart the photographer, but then wind up brawling with each other, which makes the newspapers and gets both Marcy and her pilot friend suspended from their jobs, as well as costing Mickey his account and jeopardizing Mike's job as a graduate research student and consideration for a special fellowship award for an outstanding scientist. The latter would earn Mike a teaching position at the college.

Marcy goes to the superiors of all three men personally to plead for their reinstatement. After she succeeds, each of the three Mikes proposes marriage to her as she is about to board a plane. Uncertain what to do, Marcy finally reacts favorably to Mike Lawrence's simple "I love you," and the other two Mikes concede that he is the guy for her.

Cast

 Jane Wyman as Marcy Lewis
 Van Johnson as Michael Lawrence, "Mike" the scientist
 Howard Keel as Mike Jamison, "Michael" the pilot
 Barry Sullivan as Mike Tracy, "Mickey" the ad man
 Phyllis Kirk as Kathy Hunter
 Anne Sargent as Jan Baker
 Jeff Donnell as Alice Reymend
 Herbert Heyes as Scott Bellamy
 Robert Sherwood as Benson
 Don McGuire as MacWade Parker
 Barbara Billingsley as Ann White
 Hugh Sanders as Mr. Williams
 John Maxwell as Dr. Matthew Hardy
 Lewis Martin as C.R. Smith
 Ethel "Pug" Wells as Herself
 Sydney Mason as Osgood

Production
Sidney Sheldon wrote the screenplay.Three Guys Named Mike was "based on the story by Ruth Brooks Flippen, from suggestions made by Ethel 'Pug' Wells", according to the screen credits. Wells was a flight attendant for American Airlines from Mississippi who was discovered by director William Wellman when she encountered him on a flight and told him stories of her adventures in the air. She appears in a bit part in one scene, playing herself, and is credited as "Technical Advisor".

Jane Wyman was a major star at that time and her co-stars were equally notable, with Van Johnson being one of MGM's leading actors and Howard Keel having recently achieved stardom in Annie Get Your Gun. American Airlines assisted in the production of the film and allowed the use of its aircraft for no charge. Specific airliners featured are the Douglas DC-6 and Convair 240. Many scenes were shot on location at airports and some scenes portray the training given at the American Airlines school for flight attendants.

The film entered the public domain in the United States because the claimants did not renew its copyright registration in the 28th year after publication.

ReceptionThree Guys Named Mike earned an estimated $1,707,000 at the US/Canadian box office and $523,000 elsewhere, resulting in a profit to MGM of $577,000.

Reviewer Bosley Crowther of The New York Times criticized Three Guys Named Mike, stating that "for services rendered in the advertising line, that company [American Airlines] should award her [Marcy] a gold star (its name is all over the film). But if she's still hostessing, it should keep an eye on her. We suspect she spends too much time reading those leather-bound slick magazines rather than attending to the business of serving her real-life passengers" in relation to the glamorized portrayal of airline travel.

Turner Classic Movies points out that many other critics gave a positive reception to the film.

References
Notes

Bibliography

 Morella, Joe and Edward Z. Epstein. Jane Wyman: A Biography''. New York: Delacorte Press, 1985. .

External links
 
 
 

1951 films
1951 romantic comedy films
American Airlines
American aviation films
American black-and-white films
American romantic comedy films
1950s English-language films
Films directed by Charles Walters
Films scored by Bronisław Kaper
Metro-Goldwyn-Mayer films
Films with screenplays by Sidney Sheldon
Films about flight attendants
1950s American films